George Norman may refer to:

 George Warde Norman (1793–1882), English director of the Bank of England, writer on finance, and Kent cricketer
 George Norman (cricketer, born 1890) (1890–1964), English cricketer
 George Norman (naturalist) (1823–1882), from Hull
 George Norman (pentathlete) (born 1927), British Olympic modern pentathlete
 George Wesley Norman (1883–1970), printer and political figure in Saskatchewan